Shropshire (alternatively Salop; abbreviated in print only as Shrops; demonym Salopian  ) is a landlocked historic county in the West Midlands region of England. It is bordered by Wales to the west and the English counties of Cheshire to the north, Staffordshire to the east, Worcestershire to the southeast, and Herefordshire to the south. A unitary authority of the same name was created in 2009, taking over from the previous county council and five district councils, now governed by Shropshire Council. The borough of Telford and Wrekin has been a separate unitary authority since 1998, but remains part of the ceremonial county.

The county's population and economy is centred on five towns: the county town of Shrewsbury, which is culturally and historically important and close to the centre of the county; Telford, which was founded as a new town in the east which was constructed around a number of older towns, most notably Wellington, Dawley and Madeley, which is today the most populous; Oswestry in the northwest, Bridgnorth to the south of Telford, and Ludlow in the south. The county has eighteen market towns, including Whitchurch in the north, Newport near Telford, and Market Drayton in the northeast.

The Ironbridge Gorge area is a UNESCO World Heritage Site, covering Ironbridge, Coalbrookdale and a part of Madeley. There are other historic industrial sites in the county, such as at Shrewsbury, Broseley, Snailbeach and Highley, as well as the Shropshire Union Canal.

The Shropshire Hills Area of Outstanding Natural Beauty covers about a quarter of the county, mainly in the south. Shropshire is one of England's most rural and sparsely populated counties, with a population density of 136/km2 (350/sq mi). The Wrekin is one of the most famous natural landmarks in the county, though the highest hills are the Clee Hills, Stiperstones and the Long Mynd. Wenlock Edge is another significant geographical and geological landmark. In the low-lying northwest of the county overlapping the border with Wales is the Fenn's, Whixall and Bettisfield Mosses National Nature Reserve, one of the most important and best preserved bogs in Britain. The River Severn, Great Britain's longest river, runs through the county, exiting into Worcestershire by the Severn Valley.

The county flower is the round-leaved sundew.

History

The area was once part of the lands of the Cornovii, which consisted of the modern day counties of Cheshire, Shropshire, north Staffordshire, north Herefordshire, and eastern parts of Powys. This was a tribal Celtic Iron Age kingdom. Their capital in pre-Roman times was probably a hill fort on the Wrekin. Ptolemy's 2nd century Geography names one of their towns as being Viroconium Cornoviorum (Wroxeter), which became their capital under Roman rule and one of the largest settlements in Britain. After the Roman occupation of Britain ended in the 5th century, the Shropshire area was in the eastern part of the Welsh Kingdom of Powys; known in Welsh poetry as the Paradise of Powys. Angle king Offa annexed it into Mercia in the 8th century, then built two large dykes to defend it from Welsh people (or at least demarcate it). In later centuries, Vikings repeatedly invaded and fortresses were built at Bridgnorth (912) and Chirbury (913).

After the Norman conquest in 1066, major estates in Shropshire were granted to Normans, including Roger de Montgomerie and later his son Robert de Bellême, who ordered significant constructions, particularly in Shrewsbury, the town of which he was Earl. Many defensive castles were built at this time across the county to defend against the Welsh and enable effective control of the region, including Ludlow Castle and Shrewsbury Castle. The western frontier with Wales was not finally determined until the 14th century. Also in this period, a number of religious foundations were formed, the county largely falling at this time under the Diocese of Hereford and that of Coventry and Lichfield. Some parishes in the north-west of the county in later times fell under the Diocese of St. Asaph until the disestablishment of the Church in Wales in 1920, when they were ceded to the Lichfield diocese.

The county was a central part of the Welsh Marches during the medieval period and was often embroiled in the power struggles between powerful Marcher Lords, the Earls of March and successive monarchs.

The county contains a number of historically significant towns, including Shrewsbury, Bridgnorth and Ludlow (which was the seat of the Council of Wales and the Marches). Additionally, the area around Coalbrookdale in the county is seen as highly significant, as it is regarded as one of the birthplaces of the Industrial Revolution. The village of Edgmond, near Newport, is the location of the lowest recorded temperature (in terms of weather) in England and Wales.

Etymology

Shropshire is first recorded in the Anglo-Saxon Chronicle annal for 1006. The origin of the name is the Old English Scrobbesbyrigscīr, meaning "Shrewsburyshire", "the shire of the fortified place in the scrublands" (or "shrubs", the modern derivate). Salop is an old name for Shropshire, historically used as an abbreviated form for post or telegrams, it is thought to derive from the Anglo-French "Salopesberia". It is normally replaced by the more contemporary "Shrops" although Shropshire residents are still referred to as "Salopians". Salop is also an alternative name for the county town, Shrewsbury, which shares the motto of Floreat Salopia.

When a county council for the county was first established in 1889, it was called Salop County Council. Following the Local Government Act 1972, Salop became the official name of the county. The name was not well-regarded locally, and a subsequent campaign led by a local councillor, John Kenyon, succeeded in having both the county and council renamed as Shropshire in 1980. This took effect from 1 April of that year.

County extent
The border with Wales was defined in the 16th century – the hundreds of Oswestry (including Oswestry town) and Pimhill (including Wem) and part of Chirbury had prior to the Laws in Wales Act formed various Lordships in the Welsh Marches.

The present day ceremonial county boundary is almost the same as the historic one. Notably there has been the removal of several exclaves and enclaves. The largest of the exclaves was Halesowen, which became part of Worcestershire in 1844 (and is now part of the West Midlands county), and the largest of the enclaves was Herefordshire's Farlow in South Shropshire, also transferred in 1844, to Shropshire. Alterations have been made on Shropshire's border with all neighbouring English counties over the centuries. Gains have been made to the south of Ludlow (from Herefordshire), to the north of Shifnal (from Staffordshire) and to the north (from Cheshire) and south (from Staffordshire) of Market Drayton. The county has lost land in two places – to Staffordshire and Worcestershire.

Geography
Geographically, Shropshire is divisible into two distinct halves – north and south. The county has a highly diverse geology. The West Midlands Green Belt extends into eastern Shropshire, covering an area north from Highley, to the east of Bridgnorth, north to the eastern side of Telford, leaving Shropshire eastwards alongside the A5. This encompasses Shifnal, Cosford and Albrighton, and various other villages paralleling Dudley and Wolverhampton.

North Shropshire

The North Shropshire Plain is an extension of the flat and fertile Cheshire Plain. It is here that most of the county's large towns, and population, are to be found. Shrewsbury at the centre, Oswestry to the north west, Whitchurch to the north, Market Drayton to the north east, and Newport and the Telford conurbation (Telford, Wellington, Oakengates, Donnington and Shifnal) to the east. The land is fertile and agriculture remains a major feature of the landscape and the economy. The River Severn runs through the lower half of this area (from Wales in the west, eastwards), through Shrewsbury and down the Ironbridge Gorge, before heading south to Bridgnorth.

The area around Oswestry has more rugged geography than the North Shropshire Plain and the western half is over an extension of the Wrexham Coalfield and there are also copper deposits on the border with Wales. Mining of stone and sand aggregates is still going on in Mid-Shropshire, notably on Haughmond Hill, near Bayston Hill, and around the village of Condover. Lead mining also took place at Snailbeach and the Stiperstones, but this has now ceased. Other primary industries, such as forestry and fishing, are to be found too.

The A5 and M54 run from Wolverhampton (to the east of the county) across to Telford, around Shrewsbury parallel to the line of Watling Street, an ancient trackway. The A5 then turns north west to Oswestry, before heading north into Wales in the Wrexham area. This is an important artery and the corridor is where most of Shropshire's modern commerce and industry is found, notably in Telford new town. There are also a number of railway lines crossing over the area, which centre at Shrewsbury. To the south west of Telford, near the Ironbridge Gorge, was Ironbridge Power Station.

The new town of Telford is built partly on a former industrial area centred on the East Shropshire Coalfield as well as on former agricultural land. There are still many ex-colliery sites to be found in the area, as well as disused mine shafts. This industrial heritage is an important tourist attraction, as is seen by the growth of museums in the Ironbridge, Coalbrookdale, Broseley and Jackfield area. Blists Hill museum and historical (Victorian era) village is a major tourist attraction as well as the Iron Bridge itself. In addition, Telford Steam Railway runs from Horsehay.

South Shropshire

South Shropshire is more rural, with fewer settlements and no large towns, and its landscape differs greatly from that of North Shropshire. The area is dominated by significant hill ranges and river valleys, woods, pine forests and "batches", a colloquial term for small valleys. Farming is more pastoral than the arable found in the north of the county. The only substantial towns are Bridgnorth, with a population of around 12,000 people, Ludlow and Church Stretton. Inside this area is the popular Long Mynd, a large plateau of  overlooking Church Stretton and to its west, the  rocky ridge of Stiperstones.

The A49 is the main road through the area, running north to south, from Shrewsbury to Herefordshire. A railway line runs through the area on the same route as the A49 with stations at Church Stretton, Craven Arms and Ludlow. The steam heritage Severn Valley Railway runs from Bridgnorth into Worcestershire along the Severn Valley, terminating at Kidderminster Town.

Because of its valley location and character, Church Stretton is sometimes called Little Switzerland, and is depicted in Little Switzerland. Nearby are the old mining and quarrying communities on the Clee Hills, notable geological features in the Onny Valley and Wenlock Edge and fertile farmland in Corve Dale. The River Teme drains this part of the county, before flowing into Worcestershire to the south and joining the River Severn.

It is the 13th highest county top in England.

South West Shropshire is a markedly rural part of the county, with Clun Forest, Offa's Dyke, the River Clun and the River Onny. The small towns of Clun and Bishop's Castle are in this area. To the south of Clun is the Welsh border town of Knighton.

Natural regions 

Natural England recognised the following national character areas that lie wholly or partially within Shropshire:

 Shropshire Hills
 Shropshire and Staffordshire Plain
 Oswestry Uplands
 Mid Severn Sandstone Plateau
 Teme Valley
 Herefordshire Lowlands
 Clun and North West Herefordshire Hills
 Whixall Moss

Climate

The climate of Shropshire is moderate. Rainfall averages 760 to 1,000 mm (30 to 40 in), influenced by being in the rainshadow of the Cambrian Mountains from warm, moist frontal systems of the Atlantic Ocean which bring generally light precipitation in Autumn and Spring. The hilly areas in the south and west are much colder in the winter, due to their high elevation, they share a similar climate to that of the Welsh Marches and Mid-Wales. The flat northern plain in the north and east has a similar climate to that of the rest of the West Midlands.

Being rural and inland, temperatures can fall more dramatically on clear winter nights than in many other parts of England. It was at Harper Adams University, in Edgmond, where on 10 January 1982 the lowest temperature weather record for England was broken (and is kept to this day): .

The only major Met Office weather station in the county is located at Shawbury, which is in the north, between Shrewsbury and Market Drayton.

Geology

Shropshire has a huge range of different types of rocks, stretching from the Precambrian until the Holocene. In the northern part of the county there are examples of Jurassic, Carboniferous, Permian and Triassic. Centrally, Precambrian, Cambrian, Ordovician, Carboniferous and Permian predominate. And in the south it is predominantly Silurian and Quaternary. Shropshire has a number of areas with Silurian and Ordovician rocks, where a number of shells, corals and trilobites can be found. Mortimer Forest and Wenlock Edge are examples where a number of fossils can be found.

Statistical
For Eurostat purposes, the county (less the unitary district of Telford and Wrekin) is a NUTS 3 region (code UKG22). The two Shropshire unitary areas (covering all of the ceremonial county), together with the authorities covering the ceremonial county of Staffordshire, comprise the "Shropshire and Staffordshire" NUTS 2 region.

Emblems

Flag

The Shropshire county flag was registered with the Flag Institute in March 2012. It shows three leopard heads ('loggerheads') on a gold and blue background.

Coat of arms
Shropshire's blazon is erminois, three pile azure, two issuant from the chief and one in base, each charged with a leopard's face. The arms were officially granted on 18 June 1896 and continued by the new authority in 2009. The heads are often referred to as "the loggerheads". This is thought to originate from the practice of carving a leopard head as a motif on the head of the log used as a battering ram.

County flower

In a national poll in 2002, conducted by Plantlife International, the round-leaved sundew (Drosera rotundifolia) was chosen as Shropshire's county flower. The round-leaved sundew is a crimson-coloured insectivorous plant that requires a boggy habitat. Due to habitat loss its range is now dramatically reduced, and Shropshire's Longmynd is one of the few areas in England where it can now be found.

Shropshire Day
Shropshire's county day is on 23 February, the feast day of St Milburga, abbess of Wenlock Priory. St Milburga was the daughter of Anglo-Saxon king Merewalh, who founded the abbey within his sub-kingdom of Magonsæte. The town adjoining the priory is now known as Much Wenlock, and lies within the boundaries of the modern county of Shropshire.

Motto
Shropshire's motto is Floreat Salopia, meaning "May Shropshire flourish".
BR loco No.31147 was named 'Floreat Salopia', frequently seen on trains through Shrewsbury, on 30 May 1993 and denamed on 31 May 1997 when it was presumably withdrawn from service.

Towns and villages

Shropshire has no cities, but 22 towns, of which two can be considered major. Telford is the largest town in the county with a population of 138,241 (which is approximately 30% of the total Salopian populace); whereas the county town of Shrewsbury has a lower, but still sizeable population of 71,715 (15%). The other sizeable towns are Oswestry, Bridgnorth, Newport and Ludlow. The historic town of Wellington now makes up part of the Telford conurbation. The majority of the other settlements can be classed as villages or towns such as Much Wenlock or Whitchurch. Several villages have larger populations than the smallest town, Clun. The largest of these, Bayston Hill, is the 10th most populous settlement in the county.  The names of several villages close to the border are of Welsh origin, such as Gobowen and Selattyn.

The larger settlements are primarily concentrated in a central belt that roughly follows the A5/M54 roadway. Other settlements are concentrated on rivers, for example Bridgnorth and Ironbridge on the Severn, or Ludlow on the Teme, as these waterways were historically vital for trade and a supply of water.

The town of Telford was created by the merger and expansion of older, small towns to the north and east of The Wrekin. These towns now have sizeable populations that now make up the population of Telford: Wellington (20,430), Madeley (17,935), Dawley (11,399) and Oakengates (8,517), but the Telford and Wrekin borough towns incentive aims to make Oakengates into the largest of the towns.

Historically, all or parts of the towns of Halesowen, Smethwick and Oldbury, as well as the Quinton suburb of Birmingham, were in Shropshire.

Politics

Parliamentary constituencies
The county has five parliamentary constituencies, four of which returned Conservative MPs at the 2005 general election and one, Telford, returned a Labour MP. This is a marked change from the 2001 general election result, where the county returned only one Conservative, three Labour and a Liberal Democrat MP to the House of Commons (see maps to the right) (Labour = Red, Conservatives = Blue and
Liberal Democrats = Orange).

The current MPs of Shropshire are:
 Lucy Allan, Conservative, Telford (covering the town of Telford)
 Helen Morgan, Liberal Democrat, North Shropshire (covering the former North Shropshire and Oswestry districts, now coextensive with the North area committee)
 Philip Dunne, Conservative, Ludlow (covering the former South Shropshire and (the majority of) Bridgnorth districts; now co-extensive with the South area committee except for the part covered by The Wrekin constituency)
 Daniel Kawczynski, Conservative, Shrewsbury and Atcham (covering the former Shrewsbury and Atcham district; now co-extensive with the Central area committee)
 Mark Pritchard, Conservative, The Wrekin (covering Telford and Wrekin borough, minus Telford, and including a small area of the former Bridgnorth district/South area committee)

Note (*), The Wrekin (historic UK Parliament constituency) was split at the 1997 election.

2021 refers to the by election in North Shropshire only.

Divisions and environs

Most of the ceremonial county of Shropshire is covered for purposes of local government by Shropshire Council, a unitary authority established in 2009. Telford and Wrekin is a unitary authority, with borough status, which forms part of the county for various functions such as Lord Lieutenant but is a separate local authority from Shropshire Council. Many services are shared by both authorities, such as the fire and rescue service, and the two authorities co-operate on some projects such as mapping flood risk.

The new unitary authority for Shropshire, Shropshire Council, divides the county into three areas, each with its own area committee: North, Central and South. These area committees deal with town and country planning matters.

With the parishing of the formerly unparished area of Shrewsbury in 2008, the entire ceremonial county is now parished. The sizes of parishes varies enormously in terms of area covered and population resident. Shrewsbury is the most populous parish in the county (and one of the most populous in England) with over 70,000 residents, whilst Boscobel is the smallest parish in Shropshire by geographical area and by population, with just 12 residents according to the 2001 census. The smaller parishes (with populations of less than 200) usually have a joint parish council with one or more neighbouring parishes, or in some instances, have a parish meeting (such as in Sibdon Carwood). The urban area of Telford is divided into many parishes, each covering a particular suburb, some of which are historic villages or towns (such as Madeley). The parish remains an important sub-division and tier of local government in both unitary authority areas of Shropshire.

Local government 1974–2009

In 1974 the non-metropolitan county of Shropshire was constituted, covering the entire county. There was a two-tier system of local government, constituting a county council (as the upper tier) and six district councils – Bridgnorth, North Shropshire, Oswestry, Shrewsbury and Atcham, South Shropshire and The Wrekin. In 1998 The Wrekin became a unitary authority, administratively separate from the county council, and became Telford and Wrekin. The two-tier structure remained in the remainder of the county and was the least populated two-tier area in England.

Oswestry and Shrewsbury & Atcham were each granted borough status in 1974. Telford and Wrekin became a borough in 2002.

2009 restructuring

In 2006 a local government white paper supported proposals for new unitary authorities to be set up in England in certain areas. Existing non-metropolitan counties with small populations, such as Cornwall, Northumberland and Shropshire, were favoured by the government to be covered by unitary authorities in one form or another (the county either becoming a single unitary authority, or be broken into a number of unitary authorities). For the counties in the 2009 reorganisation, existing unitary authority areas within the counties' ceremonial boundaries (such as Telford and Wrekin) were not to be affected and no boundary changes were planned.

Shropshire County Council, supported by South Shropshire District Council and Oswestry Borough Council, proposed to the government that the non-metropolitan county of Shropshire become a single unitary authority. This was opposed by the other three districts in the county, with Shrewsbury & Atcham Borough Council taking their objection to the High Court in a judicial review.

The proposal to create a Shropshire unitary authority, covering the area of the existing non-metropolitan county, was supported by the DCLG and 1 April 2009 was set as the date for the re-organisation to take place. The first elections to Shropshire Council took place on 4 June 2009, with the former Shropshire County Council being the continuing authority and its councillors became the first members of the new Shropshire Council on 1 April.

Part of the proposals include parishing and establishing a town council for Shrewsbury. The parish was created on 13 May 2008 and is the second most populous civil parish in England (only Weston-super-Mare has a greater population) with a population of over 70,000.

Political control of councils
Shropshire Council has been under Conservative control since the first election held in 2009; Telford and Wrekin Council has been under Labour control since 2011.

Transport

Shropshire is connected to the rest of the United Kingdom via a number of road and rail links. Historically, rivers and later canals in the county were used for transport also, although their use in transport is now significantly reduced. The county's main transport hub is Shrewsbury, through which many significant roads and railways pass and join.

Canals in Britain were originally constructed for the transport of goods, but are now mainly used for leisure. In addition, the Shrewsbury and Newport Canal potentially could be restored in the
future.

Major roads in the county include the M54 motorway, which connects Shropshire to the rest of the motorway network, and more specifically to the West Midlands county. The A5 also runs through the county, in an east–west direction. The road formerly ran through Shrewsbury, although a large dual-carriageway bypass has since been built. Other major trunk roads in the county include the north–south A49, the A53 and the A41.

There are a number of major railway lines running through the county, including the Welsh Marches Line, the Heart of Wales Line, the Cambrian Line, the Shrewsbury to Chester Line and the Wolverhampton to Shrewsbury Line, as well as heritage railways including the well established Severn Valley Railway. The Cambrian Heritage Railway exists in Oswestry. The three train operating companies working in the county are West Midlands Trains, Transport for Wales and Avanti West Coast. A new company, Wrexham & Shropshire, commenced services from Shropshire to London Marylebone, in spring 2008 but the service was discontinued on 28 January 2011 leaving Shrewsbury without a direct link to the capital. Virgin Trains (the operator at the time) recommenced services from Shrewsbury to London Euston on 11 December 2014, having withdrawn them in the late 1990s.

Two major water supply aqueducts run across Shropshire; the Elan aqueduct running through South Shropshire carrying water from Elan Valley to Birmingham and the Vyrnwy Aqueduct running through North Shropshire delivering water from Lake Vyrnwy to Liverpool.

Economy

 
Traditionally, agriculture has dominated the economy of Shropshire . The area later became more service-oriented. The county town of Shrewsbury, the historic castle-dominated Ludlow, the International Olympic Movement's reputed birthplace Much Wenlock and the industrial birthplace of Ironbridge Gorge are the foremost tourist areas in Shropshire, along with the restored canal-network which provides narrowboat holidays on the Shropshire Union Canal and other canals in the region. The natural beauty of the county draws people to all areas.

Industry is mostly found in Telford, Oswestry, Whitchurch, Market Drayton and Shrewsbury, though small industrial estates have developed in most of the market towns as well as on former airfields in rural areas. In towns such as Whitchurch, much of the high street is predominantly composed of small independent business which specialise in handmade items or antiques. Many of the businesses in Shropshire are family run such as Raven Yard Antiques, a family run antiques shop located in Watergate Street, Whitchurch. Shrewsbury is becoming a centre for distribution and warehousing, as it is located on a nodal point of the regional road-network.

In Telford, a new rail freight facility was opened in 2009 by Telford and Wrekin Council at Donnington with the future goal of extending the line to Stafford.

Telford and Shrewsbury are the county's two main retail centres, with contrasting styles of shopping – Shrewsbury's largely historic streets and Telford's large modern mall, Telford Shopping Centre. Shrewsbury also has two medium-sized shopping centres, the indoor "Pride Hill" and "Darwin" centres (both located on Pride Hill), and a smaller, partially covered, "Riverside Mall". Shrewsbury's location as the nearest substantial town for those in a large area of mid-Wales helps it draw in considerable numbers of shoppers, notably on Saturdays.

Well-known companies in Shropshire include Müller Dairy (UK) Ltd in Market Drayton. The Royal Air Force operates two bases at RAF Cosford and RAF Shawbury, and the charity PDSA has its head office in Priorslee, Telford.

Statistics
Below is the chart of regional gross value added for the non-metropolitan county (that is, excluding Telford & Wrekin) of Shropshire at current basic prices, with figures in millions of British pounds sterling.

With the statistics for the borough of Telford and Wrekin included, the following represents the ceremonial county:

Education

The Shropshire Council area has a completely comprehensive education system, whilst in the borough of Telford and Wrekin there are two selective schools, both of which are located in Newport — these are the Haberdashers' Adams School and Newport Girls' High School (both of which are ranked within the top thirty schools in the country). In Telford itself is the Thomas Telford School, ranked as one of the best comprehensive schools in England.

Some Shropshire children attend schools in Wales, including Llanfyllin High School.

The county has many independent schools, including Ellesmere College, founded in 1884, Shrewsbury School, founded in 1552, and Oswestry School, founded in 1407.

There are three sixth-form colleges located in Shropshire: the New College, Telford, Shrewsbury Sixth Form College and Ludlow College. Adams' Grammar and Newport Girls' High Schools both provide sixth-form education as well as secondary education.

There are also two institutions of higher education in Shropshire, the Telford campus of the University of Wolverhampton and in Edgmond, near Newport, Harper Adams University, which formerly offered mostly agriculture-based degrees but is expanding its range of provision. A third higher education institution was created in Shrewsbury in 2015, which is a campus of the University of Chester.

In Ironbridge, the University of Birmingham operates the Ironbridge Institute in partnership with the Ironbridge Gorge Museum Trust, which offers postgraduate and professional development courses in heritage.

Shropshire has the highest educational attainment in the West Midlands region.

Places of interest

 Adcote nr. Shrewsbury
 Attingham Park, Atcham
 Benthall Hall, Broseley
 Blists Hill, Madeley
 Boscobel House, nr. Wolverhampton
 Bridgnorth Cliff Railway, Bridgnorth
 Bridgnorth Castle, Bridgnorth
 Brown Clee Hill, South Shropshire
 Buildwas Abbey, Buildwas
 Burford House
 Caer Caradoc, nr. Church Stretton
 Cambrian Heritage Railway, Oswestry and Llynclys
 Chetwynd Park, Newport
 Cardingmill Valley, Church Stretton
 Clun Castle, Clun
 Flounder's Folly, nr. Craven Arms
 Fordhall castle and farm
 Haughmond Hill, nr. Shrewsbury
 Haughmond Abbey
 Hawkstone Park, North Shropshire
 Hopton Castle, nr. Craven Arms
 Ironbridge Gorge
 Kynaston's Cave, nr. Nesscliffe
 Langley Chapel, nr. Shrewsbury
 Lilleshall Abbey, nr Newport
 The Long Mynd, Church Stretton
 Ludlow Castle, Ludlow

 Mitchell's Fold, nr. Chirbury
 Moreton Corbet Castle, Moreton Corbet
 Newport Guildhall, Newport
 Offa's Dyke Path, Welsh Marches
 Puleston Cross, Newport
 Severn Valley Railway, Bridgnorth
 Shrewsbury Abbey, Shrewsbury
 Shrewsbury Castle, Shrewsbury
 Shropshire Hills Area of Outstanding Natural Beauty (AONB), South Shropshire
 Shropshire Union Canal
 Snailbeach Lead Mines nr. Shrewsbury
 South Telford Heritage Trail, Telford
 St Laurence Church, Ludlow
 The Stiperstones, nr Pontesbury
 Stokesay Castle, nr Craven Arms
 Sunnycroft, Wellington
 Telford Steam Railway, Telford
 Titterstone Clee Hill, nr. Ludlow
 Wenlock Edge, Much Wenlock
 Wenlock Priory
 White Ladies Priory
 Whittington Castle, nr. Oswestry
 The Wrekin (and Ercall) nr. Wellington
 Wroxeter Roman City, Wroxeter, nr. Atcham

Notable people

 Abraham Darby, early industrialist
 Adrian Jones, sculptor of the Quadriga at Hyde Park Corner
 Alison Williamson, of Church Stretton, Archery Olympic bronze medalist
 Amy Bagshaw, an international gymnast   
 Barbara Pym, novelist
 Billy Wright, born in Ironbridge, Wolverhampton Wanderers footballer and England captain
 Carol Decker, lead singer of the 1980s pop group T'Pau, went to school in Shropshire
 Charles Babbage, early computing pioneer, lived at Dudmaston Hall in 1814
 Charles Darwin, eminent naturalist developed the theory of evolution by natural selection, born in Shrewsbury
 Chris Hawkins radio presenter and DJ, born in Loppington
 Craig Phillips of Newport, winner of Big Brother 2000
 David Edwards, footballer (born in Pontesbury), Wolverhampton Wanderers F.C & Wales
 Edith Pargeter (1913–1995), author
 Edmund Plowden (1518–1585), legal scholar and theorist
 Sir Edmund Plowden (1590–1659), Proprietor, Earl Palatine and Governor of New Albion
 Edric the Wild, an Anglo-Saxon magnate
 Edward Waring (1736–1798), mathematician
 Eglantyne Jebb of Ellesmere, social reformer and founder of the Save the Children Fund
 Fred Jordan farm worker from Ludlow and one of the great traditional English singers
 George Jeffreys of Wem, infamous judge
 Georgina Frederica Jackson, compiler of Shropshire Word-Book
 Sir Gordon Richards (1902-1986), 26 times flat racing Champion Jockey, born at Donnington Wood
 Greg Davies, comedian and actor grew up in Wem
 Humphrey Kynaston (died 1534), highwayman
 Isobel Cooper (Izzy), famous opera singer from Much Wenlock
 Ivan Jones, writer of The Ghost Hunter
 John Benbow, Admiral of the White, born Shrewsbury
 Joe Hart, born in Shrewsbury, Celtic and England goalkeeper
 John Mytton, 'Mad Jack' Mytton, Regency rake, MP, gambler and horseman
 John Wilkinson, of Broseley, industrialist
 Jonathan Corbett TV presenter,
 K. K. Downing, guitarist with Judas Priest
 Lara Jones, writer of the Poppy Cat books
 Len Murray, former head of the T.U.C.
 Lord Acton, famous 19th century historian
 Mal Lewis Jones, writer
 Mary Beard, classicist and public personality at Cambridge University
 Mary Webb (1881–1927), author
 Matthew Jones, footballer
 Matthew Webb, first man to swim the English Channel
 Mirabel Osler, author
 Pete Postlethwaite, actor lived near Church Stretton until his death in 2011
 Sir Philip Sidney, prominent Elizabethan
 Robert Clive, 1st Baron Clive, 'Clive of India', born near Market Drayton 
 Rowland Hill, 1st Viscount Hill, Napoleonic era general
 Roy Wood, of Wem, in the band Wizzard
 Stewart Lee, stand-up comedian, writer and director.
 Sybil Ruscoe, TV and radio presenter
 Trevor Rees-Jones, bodyguard and author
 Tricia Sullivan, American science fiction author, lives in Shropshire
 Wilfred Owen, leading First World War poet
 William Farr, epidemiologist and early bio-statistician
 William Henry Griffith Thomas, (1861–1924) evangelical Anglican theologian
 William Penny Brookes, from Much Wenlock, founder Wenlock Olympian Games 
 William Wycherley, Restoration dramatist and playwright famous for The Country Wife

Cultural references

 Shropshire has been depicted and mentioned in a number of works of literature. The poet A. E. Housman used Shropshire as the setting for many of the poems in his first book, A Shropshire Lad, and many of Malcolm Saville's children's books are set in Shropshire. Additionally, D. H. Lawrence's novella, St. Mawr, is partially set in the Stiperstones area of South Shropshire.
 The early twentieth century novelist and poet Mary Webb was born in Shropshire and lived most of her life there, and all her novels are set there, most notably  Precious Bane, with its powerful evocation of the Shropshire countryside.  A school in Pontesbury bears her name.
 In Susanna Clarke's Jonathan Strange & Mr Norrell (2004), Jonathan Strange is from the county, and some parts of the book are set there.
 Another fictional character from Shropshire is Mr Grindley, from Charles Dickens' Bleak House.
 P. G. Wodehouse's fictional Blandings Castle, the ancestral home of Clarence, the ninth Earl of Emsworth, is located in Shropshire. Also from Shropshire is Psmith, a fictional character in a series of Wodehouse's novels.
 In Oscar Wilde's The Importance of Being Earnest, Algernon attempts to trick Jack into revealing the location of his country home by inferring he resides in Shropshire.
 The 1856 plantation literature novel White Acre vs. Black Acre by William M. Burwell features two Shropshire farms acting as an allegory for American slavery – White Acre Farm being the abolitionist Northern United States, and Black Acre Farm being the slaveholding Southern United States.
 The county has also appeared in film: the 1984 film version of Charles Dickens' A Christmas Carol was filmed in Shrewsbury. The 2005 sit-com The Green Green Grass is set in Shropshire and was filmed near Ludlow.
 Shrewsbury Abbey of Shropshire features in The Cadfael Chronicles; Brother Cadfael is a member of the community at the Abbey.
 In the novel Howards End, Mr. Wilcox's daughter gets married in Shropshire. Part of the novel is set near Clun.

Sport

There are a significant number of sporting clubs and facilities in Shropshire, many of which are found in Shrewsbury and Telford in addition to a number of clubs found locally throughout the county. Shropshire is home to a variety of established amateur, semi-pro and professional sports clubs.

The county is home to one of five National Sports Centres. Situated at Lilleshall Hall just outside Newport in Lilleshall, this is where the 1966 England National football team trained for two weeks prior to their success in the World Cup of 1966.

Football

The three highest football (and only professional) clubs in the county are Shrewsbury Town (EFL League One), A.F.C. Telford United (National League North) and The New Saints (Welsh Premier League) in Oswestry.

There are numerous semi-professional football clubs in the lower leagues. The governing body in the county is the Shropshire Football Association, who organise a number of county-wide cup competitions, including the Shropshire Senior Cup. In 2020 the Shropshire County Football League was created, replacing the Shropshire Premier League.  the following Shropshire clubs play in these English leagues (the highest team of each club shown only):

Also, some clubs situated near the Welsh border play in the Welsh league system:

Other sports
The historic Wenlock Olympian Society Annual Games (begun 1850) are held annually in Much Wenlock during the second weekend in July. A four-day festival, the Games include cricket, volleyball, tennis, bowls, badminton, triathlon, 10k road race, track and field events, archery, five-a-side football, veteran cycle events, clay pigeon shooting and a golf competition.

The county has a number of private and public golf courses, including the Church Stretton Golf Club, situated on the slopes of the Long Mynd. It is the oldest 18-hole golf course in Shropshire, opened in 1898, and one of the highest in the United Kingdom. There is one notable horse racing racecourse in Shropshire, near Ludlow, the Ludlow Racecourse.

The area also has a rich motorsports heritage, with the Loton Park Hillclimb and Hawkstone Park Motocross Circuit situated near Shrewsbury. Shrewsbury Motocross Club has staged motocross events in the area for over 30 years. There is additionally an ice hockey club in the county, the Telford Tigers.

One of the biggest one-day events in Shropshire and the biggest one-day cycle race in the UK is the Shropshire Star Newport Nocturne, founded 1970; held every four years, it is Britain's only floodlit cycle race.

The county has one American football team, Shropshire Revolution, which was founded in 2006, and is a club in the British American Football League. Former teams in the county have included the Wrekin Giants, which ran from 1985 to 1989 and the Shropshire Giants which ran in 1989. Shropshire has a number of rugby clubs, including Newport (Salop) Rugby Union Football Club, the highest-leveled team in the county, playing in the National League 3 Midlands.

See also 
 7603 Salopia – an asteroid named after the county
 53rd Regiment of Foot – former British Army regiment
 Diocese of Shrewsbury – Roman Catholic diocese which covers all of Shropshire
 Etymological list of counties of the United Kingdom – list of name origins
 Healthcare in Shropshire
 Shropshire Archives – collects and makes accessible archives and books relating to the county
 Shropshire Blue cheese

Notes

References

Further reading 
 Gareth Roddy, "'Westward on the high-hilled plains': the literature of Shropshire and the early twentieth century imagination, 1896–c.1939", Contemporary British History, vol. 33, no. 1 (2019), pp. 28–51.

External links 

 Shropshire Council
 
 BBC Shropshire news
 Shropshire Star
 Images of Shropshire at the English Heritage Archive
  The History of Parliament: the House of Commons - Shropshire, County, 1386 to 1831

 
Ceremonial counties of England
Counties of the Welsh Marches
Counties of England established in antiquity